Manfred Wagner (31 August 1938 – 10 February 2015) was a German football defender.

Between 1963 and 1970 he played 187 Bundesliga games for TSV 1860 Munich. His greatest successes were the 1966 league championship, as well as reaching the 1965 UEFA Cup Winners' Cup Final.

Honours
1860 Munich
 UEFA Cup Winners' Cup finalist: 1964–65
 Bundesliga: 1965–66; runner-up: 1966–67
 DFB-Pokal: 1963–64

References

1938 births
2015 deaths
German footballers
TSV 1860 Munich players
Bundesliga players
Association football defenders
Footballers from Munich
West German footballers